Yaadein is a 2001 Indian Hindi-language musical drama film written, directed, edited and produced by Subhash Ghai. The ensemble cast cross over film starring Jackie Shroff, Hrithik Roshan, and Kareena Kapoor.It was inspired by Jane Austen's Pride and Prejudice. The film was released worldwide on 27 July 2001 to negative reviews and was a box office disappointment. Jackie Shroff received a nomination for Filmfare Award for Best Supporting Actor at the 47th Filmfare Awards.

The filming took place in locations such as the Cliveden House, which was used as Ronit's family mansion, the  Apex Bar and Restaurant, Radisson Hampshire, the Leicester Square, the Ascot, the King's Arms Pub, the Thames Embankment, the Thorpe Park, the Tower Bridge, the Windsor Great Park, the Windsor and Eton Central railway station, the Windsor Castle, the Piccadilly Circus, the Queensmere Shopping Centre, Slough, in the U.K. The Eagle Square, and Langkawi Yacht Club Langkawi, Malaysia, the Lake Palace Hotel, Udaipur, Rajasthan, and
Panchkula.

Plot
Raj Singh Puri (Jackie Shroff) is best friends with Lalit Malhotra (Anang Desai), the younger brother of J.K. Malhotra (Amrish Puri). The Malhotras are wealthy business tycoons in London. Lalit and his wife Nalini's (Supriya Karnik) business lifestyles have left little time for their son, Ronit (Hrithik Roshan), who opposes his family's greed and as a child came to regard his "uncle" Raj and late "aunt" Shalini as his surrogate parents. Raj's wife, Shalini (Rati Agnihotri), died in an accident some years prior, leaving Raj to raise their three daughters alone. Ronit has maintained close friendships with Raj and his daughters, having grown up with them.

Raj's eldest daughter, Avantika, is happy in her arranged marriage to Ronit's college friend, Pankaj; his second daughter, Saania, marries her boyfriend Sukant against Raj's advice, and despite stark differences in family values and upbringing. Isha (Kareena Kapoor), the youngest and most strong-willed one, claims that she does not believe in love. After a few weeks of living with her in-laws and bearing their taunts and abuse, Saania returns home begging for a divorce but eventually reconciles with Sukant. Meanwhile, Isha and Ronit attend a sports event in Malaysia, where their friendship unexpectedly blossoms into love. Neither are aware that back in London, Ronit's parents are secretly arranging for him to marry Monishka Rai (Kiran Rathod), the modern, spoiled daughter of another business tycoon, in order to create a business merger between the two wealthy families. With Raj being a longtime friend of the Rai family, the Malhotras recruit Raj to help them facilitate the marriage proposal. Raj agrees, the Malhotras having misled him to believe that Ronit would be happy with the marriage.

Raj is shocked when Isha asks for his blessing to marry Ronit, his loyalties to the Malhotra and Rai families making him feel guilty. Overcome with emotion, he ends up injuring himself in an accident, upsetting Isha. Though sympathetic to Isha's feelings, Raj informs her of Ronit's planned engagement and explains that she would never find acceptance as a daughter-in-law in the Malhotra family, due to their obsession with money. Isha then ends her relationship with Ronit and pretends that she loves Ronit only as a friend, although doing so deeply hurts her. Ronit, heartbroken and angry, is pressured by both Raj and his parents to marry Monishka. Bitterly agreeing to the engagement, Ronit soon discovers that Monishka and her parents' lifestyles are totally opposite to the Malhotras' own traditional Indian values; after proving this to Raj, Raj begs the Malhotras to reconsider the engagement. This culminates in J.K. Malhotra publicly insulting Raj, and accusing him of using Isha to worm his way into their wealthy family. Shattered, Raj ends his relationship with the Malhotras.

On the eve of the engagement party, during which the Malhotras and Rais plan to announce their business merger, Ronit lashes out at his parents for their lifelong neglect of his feelings. He and Isha then reconcile and appear to elope, sending the Malhotras into a panic. Nalini is the first to understand Ronit's plight and apologizes to Raj, who convinces Ronit and Isha to return home. With Nalini and Monishka's support, at the engagement party Ronit gives a speech that exposes the families' selfish sacrifice of their children's happiness for money, which shocks the guests and prompts the Rai family to cancel the business merger. J.K. begs both Raj and Isha for forgiveness, and the Malhotras give their blessing to Ronit and Isha.

The film ends with a flashforward to several years later, showing an aged Raj with Avantika's young daughter, and implying that Raj's three daughters remain close and happily married.

Cast
Jackie Shroff as Raj Singh Puri
Hrithik Roshan as Ronit Malhotra
Kareena Kapoor as Isha Singh Puri / Isha Ronit Malhotra 
Rati Agnihotri as Shalini Puri, Raj's deceased wife.
 Supriya Karnik as Nalini Malhotra, Ronit's mother.
Amrish Puri as Jagdish Kumar Malhotra, Ronit's uncle.
Anang Desai as Lalit Kumar Malhotra, Ronit's father.
Kiran Rathod as Monishka Rai 
 Avni Vasa as Avantika Puri 
 Himani Rawat as Saania Puri 
Madan Joshi as Mr. Ranvir Rai, Monishka's father.
Dolly Bindra as Sania's mother-in-law
Kamya Panjabi as Pinky, Isha's friend.
Subhash Ghai in a cameo in the watch present scene.
 Suhas Khandke
 Rajan Kapoor as Sukant's father
Rahul Singh 
 Gargi Patel as Mrs. Kudesia
Suman Dutta
Jennifer Kotwal as Preeti Sahai
 Kamal Adib as Mr. Kudesia
 Akhil Ghai as Pankaj Kudesia, Avantika's husband.
Sheena Bajaj as Supriya, Avantika and Pankaj's daughter.

Soundtrack 

Music for the film's soundtrack was composed by Anu Malik and lyrics written by Anand Bakshi. Subhash Ghai wanted A. R. Rahman to compose for the film, but the latter declined the offer, since he was busy with the work of Bombay Dreams. According to the Indian trade website Box Office India, with 2.2million units sold, the film's soundtrack album was the year's seventh highest-selling Bollywood music album.

References

External links
 
 
 
 

Films directed by Subhash Ghai
Indian romantic musical films
Films set in England
Films set in London
Films set in India
Films set in Malaysia
Films shot in India
Films shot in London
Films shot in Malaysia
2000s Hindi-language films
Films scored by Anu Malik
2000s romantic musical films
Indian romantic drama films
2001 romantic drama films
2001 films